Frederick MacSorley or McSorley  (1892 – 9 February 1948) was a Belfast-based Irish surgeon and independent member of the House of Commons of Northern Ireland.

He unsuccessfully stood as an independent for Queen's University of Belfast before being elected in July 1945. His initial run for office was seen as encouragement for more Catholics to vote.

Biography
MacSorley came from a middle-class Belfast Catholic family with deep clerical and medical connections - one brother was a member of the Redemptorist order, a sister a nun and several cousins and brothers also doctors.
He was educated at St. Malachy's College and entered Queen's University Belfast. He qualified as a physician in 1916, took his doctorate of medicine in 1922. In 1930, he became a Fellow of the Royal College of Physicians of Ireland.  He worked as a visiting physician at both the Mater Infirmorum Hospital and Belfast City Hospital for many years.

While still in office, he died at his home in Belfast, aged 56. He was survived by his wife, Jane Mary, with whom he had four sons, Rev. Liam MacSorley, Dr. Michael MacSorley, Rev Frederick MacSorley, and Dr. Eamon MacSorley, and daughters Maureen MacSorley and Kathleen MacSorley.

At his funeral Bishop Daniel Mageean presided and the Archbishop of Armagh John D'Alton attended. Significantly the Unionist Prime Minister of Northern Ireland Basil Brooke, 1st Viscount Brookeborough was represented by Mr W.N. McWilliam.

References 

1892 births
1948 deaths
People educated at St Malachy's College
Surgeons from Northern Ireland
Independent members of the House of Commons of Northern Ireland
Members of the House of Commons of Northern Ireland for Queen's University of Belfast
Members of the House of Commons of Northern Ireland 1945–1949
Fellows of the Royal College of Physicians of Ireland
20th-century surgeons